Elena D'Orgaz was a Mexican actress of the Golden Age of Mexican cinema.

Selected filmography
 Dreams of Love (1935)
 El Rosario de Amozoc (1938)
 The Whip (1939)
 The Sign of Death (1939)
 Borrasca humana (1940)
 Saint Francis of Assisi (1944)
 El Capitán Malacara (1945)

References

Bibliography
 Darlene J. Sadlier. Latin American Melodrama: Passion, Pathos, and Entertainment. University of Illinois Press, 2009.

External links

Year of birth unknown
1947 deaths
Mexican film actresses
20th-century Mexican actresses